The Winyaw were a Native American tribe living near Winyah Bay, Black River, and the lower course of the Pee Dee River in South Carolina. The Winyaw people disappeared as a distinct entity after 1720 and are thought to have merged with the Waccamaw.

Name 
The meaning of the name Winyaw is unknown. Winyaw has also been written as Winyah, Weenee, and Wineaw.

History
The Winyaw might have been the Yenyohol mentioned in 1521 by Francisco de Chicora, a Native American captive held by the Spanish. If so, they may have been carried away during Lucas Vázquez de Ayllón's expedition during that same year. 

The Winyaw were first mentioned by colonists of South Carolina after 1670. The tribe at first allied with the English colonists who settled in Charles Town, but this friendship soon was shattered when European slave dealers instigated a war against them in 1683 as an excuse to capture slaves. During the Tuscarora War of 1711, John Barnwell brought 24 "Wineaws" on his expedition into North Carolina, but they deserted him before arriving because they refused to go further with no guns or ammunition. In 1715, the Cheraw tried to pressure them into participating in the Yamasee War against the English but they refused, staying on friendly terms with the colonists.

Later in 1715, the Winyaw lived in a single village of 106 people. By 1716, a number of them moved to the Santee River. After two years the Winyaw on the Santee returned to their former residence to be near the trading house operated by Meredith Hughes at Uauenee, a location believed to have translated to "Great Bluff."

When the Waccamaw moved to the Black River in 1718, the Winyaw may have felt crowded, for they apparently helped the English in the Waccamaw War during 1720. A 1722 map depicts the Winyaw staying on the south side of the Pee Dee River. 

Nothing more is known of the Winyaw as they disappeared as a distinct entity. It is assumed that they later merged with the Waccamaw.

Legacy
While the tribe disappeared from history during the early 18th century, Winyah Bay in South Carolina still bears their name.

Notes

References 
 
 

Extinct Native American tribes
Native American history of South Carolina
Native American tribes in South Carolina